Moussac is the name or part of the name of several communes in France:

 Moussac, in the Gard department
 Moussac, in the Vienne department

oc:Molesan